JLH may refer to:

 "JLH" (song), a song by King Missile
 Jabb Love Hua
 Jennifer Love Hewitt
 John Lee Hooker
 John Linsley Hood
 Jon Ludvig Hammer
 Joseph Lowthian Hudson
 Justice League Heroes